Breast Cancer Campaign was a breast cancer research charity based in the United Kingdom. In 2015, Breast Cancer Campaign merged with another charity, Breakthrough Breast Cancer, to form the UK's largest breast cancer research charity - Breast Cancer Now.

History

In 2014 it was announced that Breast Cancer Campaign would be merging with the charity Breakthrough Breast Cancer.

Breast Cancer Campaign Tissue Bank
The Breast Cancer Campaign Tissue Bank is a collaboration between four research centres. It aims to create a bank of breast cancer tissues for researchers to study.
The four research centres are:

The University of Leeds
Barts Cancer Institute, Queen Mary University of London
The University of Dundee
The University of Nottingham

Campaigning activities
Breast Cancer Campaign have support the Off-patent Drugs Bill a Private Members Bill that would increase Government support for off-patent drugs where there is no incentive for pharmaceutical companies to support the creation of life enhancing breast cancer drugs.

Fundraising activities
wear it pink is a UK-wide fundraising initiative organised by Breast Cancer Now. Held annually in October, which is Breast Cancer Awareness Month, supporters wear an item of pink and in return donate £2 each. The money raised funds around 100 projects, specifically breast cancer research throughout the UK and Ireland.  This awareness emphasizes the need for improved diagnosis, treatment, prevention and cure.

wear it pink is the UK's original and biggest pink day during October. Set up in 2002 by Campaign to help fundraise for breast cancer research, since its beginning, the fundraising initiative has raised over £23 million for breast cancer research. Anyone can take part and it is popular with office workers, schools and community clubs. The 2011 Wear it Pink event raised £2.2 million for cancer research. The 2017 event will take place on Friday 20 October.  As said by a Bolton West MP, "I know people who have lost friends and family members to the disease and I would like to encourage local residents to support Wear it Pink to raise valuable funds for breast cancer research".

See also
Cancer Drugs Fund

References

External links
Breast Cancer Campaign
Wear It Pink
Tissue Bank
Grants

Breast cancer organizations
Former cancer organisations based in the United Kingdom
Health charities in the United Kingdom
Organizations established in 1988